Sebastian Ylönen (born 3 July 1991) is a French ice hockey goaltender for the Jokers de Cergy-Pontoise and the French national team.

He represented France at the 2019 IIHF World Championship. Ylönen also holds Finnish citizenship.

Early life
Ylönen was born in Rouen, France, to a Finnish father and a French mother. His father is the former ice hockey player Petri Ylönen.

References

External links

1991 births
Living people
Anglet Hormadi Élite players
Boxers de Bordeaux players
Dragons de Rouen players
Finnish ice hockey goaltenders
French ice hockey goaltenders
Gothiques d'Amiens players
Jokipojat players
KeuPa HT players
Lukko players
Rapaces de Gap players
Sportspeople from Rouen
Finnish people of French descent
French people of Finnish descent